Alemán may refer to:

Alemán or Aleman (surname)
Alemán (rapper) (born 1990), stage name of Mexican rapper Erick Raúl Alemán Ramírez
Colegio y Liceo Alemán de Montevideo, German School of Montevideo, noted for its handball team